Tokyo One Piece Tower was an indoor theme park for the popular Japanese manga series, One Piece. It opened on March 13, 2015 inside Tokyo Tower. Since its opening, it underwent a partial renovation and reopened on June 18, 2016. It offered several games and attractions based on characters of the Straw Hat Crew from One Piece, entertainment shows, merchandise shops and themed restaurants, and seasonal events and campaigns.

The core concept is that the whole park was an island in the New World called Tongari Island (トンガリ島), that the Straw Hat Crew landed on, and they created games and attractions for their fans with the islanders. The island's leader is Tongari Den Den Mushi who frequently appeared as the guide in some attractions and the website. Tongari (トンガリ) means "pointed" or "sharp" in Japanese and it refers to the shape of Tokyo Tower.

In 2016, it ranked 7th in TripAdvisor 2016 Traveler's Choice Top 10 Amusement Parks in the Japan region.

The park closed down permanently on July 31, 2020, due to the impact of the COVID-19 pandemic on its management.

Attractions

360 Log Theatre -The World of One Piece 
An experiential attraction where the famous scenes of Straw Hat Crew adventure from the manga series were projected onto a 360 degree omnidirectional screen. It was located on the third floor, the entrance floor of One Piece Tower, and was the first attraction to welcome visitors to the island.

Luffy's Endless Adventure 
A walkthrough attraction that followed the history of the protagonist, Monkey D. Luffy and his fellow characters. It was located on the 5th floor. There were life-size statues of characters, miniatures, and exhibition panels.

There was a movie theater with a wide screen at the end showing an original short film only available at Tokyo One Piece Tower.

Zoro's Soul of Edge 
An interactive game based on one of Straw Hat Crew, Roronoa Zoro located on the fourth floor. Inside was a Dojo that Zoro established and the players must slash down cannons fired from the screen in front to defeat Marines with a sword using Zoro's skills.

Also, Zoro's and other characters’ swords and weapons were displayed on the wall inside this attraction.

Nami's Casino House 
An interactive attraction based on the navigator of Straw Hat Crew, Nami located on the fourth floor. It was a casino game where the players bet a certain amount of Berries, the world currency in One Piece, for a three-point match to win a jackpot. The winners with over a certain amount of Berries received a VIP card.

Usopp's Road to Sogeking 
An interactive game based on one of Straw Hat Crew, Usopp located on the fourth floor. Players shoot the Marines with a slingshot, Usopp's iconic weapon for a given time. The last enemy was the World Government.

Chopper's Thousand Sunny Tours 
An interactive walkthrough attraction guided by one of Straw Hat Crew, Tony Tony Chopper located on the fourth floor. The whole attraction imitated the interior of Straw Hat Crew's second ship, Thousand Sunny. It included the kitchen and dining, Nami and Robin's bedroom, and other facilities inside Thousand Sunny.

Robin's Finding Poneglyph 
An interactive game based on one of Straw Hat Crew, Nico Robin located on the fourth floor involving the whole park. The players were given one Transponder Snail to find many ancient characters hidden all over the park to finally discover Poneglyph in the ancient remains.

Franky's Park 
An area dedicated to the shipwright, Franky on the fourth floor. There was a pinball machine called "Franky's Ball Run" in the shape of Franky, a colorful children’s area with toys, and a small cafe called Franky's Cola Bar offering light meals and beverages.

Brook's Horror House 
A haunted house based on one of Straw Hat Crew, Brook. The players were given one salt ball (塩玉) to defeat zombies roaming inside the haunted house.

Tongari Island Photo Spots 
There were numerous photo spots inside the park including characters’ life-size statues, portraits, special exhibitions, etc.

One Piece Live Attraction live show 
One Piece Live Attraction original entertainment show where live One Piece characters unfolded an adventurous story on stage. The theater was located on the 5th floor. Approximately four to six shows were held every day. The storyline changes seasonally.

Shops and Restaurants

Tongari Store 

A merchandise shop inside the park on the third floor offering exclusive goods and items with original designs only at Tokyo One Piece Tower.

One Piece Mugiwara store 
A One Piece official merchandise shop outside the park on the first floor of Tokyo Tower offering One Piece goods and items. There were exclusive items only on sale at Tokyo Tower.

Franky's Cola Bar 
A small cafe inside the park managed by Coca-Cola lover Franky. It offered various light meals and beverages, and some tables and chairs to rest.

Cafe Mugiwara 
A library cafe located on the first floor of Tokyo Tower that offered foods and beverages inspired by different characters and stories from One Piece. It had more than six hundred books and comics from the world related to ONE PIECE, including original manga series, for visitors to read freely while they eat and rest.

It offered special monthly birthday menus for a certain character from One Piece. Also, it often collaborates with other events such as Ichiban Kuji

It is open from 10 a.m. to 10 p.m.

Sanji's Oresama Restaurant 
A restaurant run by Straw Hat Crew's cook, Sanji located on the ground floor of Tokyo Tower beside Cafe Mugiwara. It offered various meals in buffet style from 11 a.m. to 3 p.m. (maximum 70 minutes stay) and a la carte style from 3 p.m. to 10 p.m. including a course menu and special events related menus.

"ORESAMA (俺様)" is a narcissistic way of saying "me" in Japanese and the first personal pronoun Sanji refers to himself in the One Piece series. His statue stood between Mugiwara Cafe and Sanji's ORESAMA Restaurant.

The interiors imitated various items or scenes from ONE PIECE such as a mast, prison bars, etc. for visitors to indulge in the world of ONE PIECE.

References

External links 
 Tokyo One Piece Tower official website in English.

2015 establishments in Japan
2020 disestablishments in Japan
Amusement parks closed in 2020
Amusement parks opened in 2015
Defunct amusement parks in Japan
One Piece